San Isidro de Maino is a district of the province of Chachapoyas in Peru. Its capital is the town of San Isidro de Mayno.

The district covers an area of 101.67 km² with an altitude ranging between 1,200 and 2,500 m above sea level in the district capital, and up to 2,800 m in the high part named "The Pajonal". The climate is dry and moderately cold.

In the north and west the district of San Isidro de Maino shares a border with the Levanto District, in the East with the Soloco District and the Cochamal District, and in the south with the Magdalena District.

External links
San Isidro de Maino district official website 

1952 establishments in Peru
States and territories established in 1952
Districts of the Chachapoyas Province
Districts of the Amazonas Region